Joseph Galanes (born June 3, 1965) is an American cross-country skier. He competed in the men's 15 kilometre classical event at the 1988 Winter Olympics.

References

External links
 

1965 births
Living people
American male cross-country skiers
Olympic cross-country skiers of the United States
Cross-country skiers at the 1988 Winter Olympics
People from Brattleboro, Vermont
Vermont Catamounts skiers
Sportspeople from Vermont
20th-century American people